American Bridge may refer to:
American Bridge Company, civil engineering firm
American Bridge 21st Century, super PAC
The American Bridge, Newbury, a former road bridge in Newbury, England
The American Bridge, Saint Petersburg, a railway bridge in Saint Petersburg, Russia

See also
American Bridge Association